Adrián "Adri" Herrera González (born 3 January 1999) is a Spanish professional footballer who plays for Zamora CF on loan from CD Tenerife as a forward.

Club career
Born in Coria, Cáceres, Extremadura, Herrera joined Real Valladolid's youth setup in 2014, after representing Club Internacional de la Amistad and EF Villamuriel. On 23 August 2018, after finishing his formation, he was loaned to Tercera División side CD Cristo Atlético for the season.

Herrera made his senior debut on 26 August 2018, playing the last 14 minutes in a 3–0 home win against CD Bupolsa. He scored his first goals on 16 September, netting a hat-trick in a 5–0 home routing of CF Briviesca, and finished the campaign with 14 goals, being the club's top goalscorer.

On 7 July 2019, Herrera moved to CD Numancia, being initially assigned to the reserves also in the fourth division. He made his professional debut the following 15 February, coming on as a late substitute for Marc Mateu in a 1–1 Segunda División home draw against UD Las Palmas.

On 20 August 2020, Herrera signed a two-year contract with CD Tenerife, being immediately loaned to Zamora CF in Segunda División B, for one year.

References

External links

1999 births
Living people
Sportspeople from the Province of Cáceres
Spanish footballers
Footballers from Extremadura
Association football forwards
Segunda División players
Tercera División players
Real Valladolid Promesas players
CD Numancia B players
CD Numancia players
CD Tenerife players
Zamora CF footballers